Glyphipterix thrasonella is a species of moth of the  family Glyphipterigidae. It is found in the western part of the Palaearctic realm.

The wingspan is 11–15 mm.The forewings are shining bronzy, sometimes coppery-tinged ; six obscure golden metallic transverse streaks from costa between 1/3 and apex, and one or two from dorsum posteriorly, all sometimes obsolete ; a violet -black mark on tornus, enclosing two or three golden metallic dots, and a similar dot above it ; sometimes two or three fine black dashes above this ; a blackish apical spot ; dark line of cilia indented below apex. Hindwings are dark fuscous.

Adults are on wing from May to August.

The larvae probably feed on Juncus species.

References

External links
UKmoths

Moths described in 1763
Glyphipterigidae
Moths of Europe
Taxa named by Giovanni Antonio Scopoli